The Philip Morris v. Uruguay case  it was a judicial process started on 19 February 2010 and concluded on 8 July 2016, in which the multinational tobacco company Philip Morris International (PMI), whose head office is located in Lausanne, a complaint against Uruguay at the International Centre for Settlement of Investment Disputes (ICSID). 

The reference to the process is Case ICSID N° ARB/10/7,and the case name is: FTR Holdings S.A. (Switzerland) and others against Oriental Republic of Uruguay.

The Philip Morris company sued Uruguay for an amount of twenty-five million dollars, for engaging in anticompetitive practices alleging a violation of the bilateral investment treaty between Switzerland and Uruguay.

The company complained that Uruguay's anti-smoking legislation devalued its cigarette trademarks and investments in the country and was suing Uruguay for compensation under the bilateral investment treaty between Switzerland and Uruguay. (Philip Morris is headquartered in Lausanne.)

The treaty provides that disputes be settled by binding arbitration before the International Centre for Settlement of Investment Disputes (ICSID).

Uruguay had received accolades from the World Health Organization and from anti-smoking activists for its anti-smoking campaign.

On 8 July 2016, after 6 years, the ICSID ruled in favor of Uruguay, forcing the demandant to pay the expenses of the defendants and the court.

Context 
On 19 June 2003, when the Uruguayan President was Jorge Batlle, the General Assembly of Uruguay approved the WHO Framework Convention on Tobacco Control, an international treaty that requires signatories to enact various anti-smoking policies recommended by the World Health Organization.

In 2006, Uruguay under President Tabaré Vázquez, an oncologist by profession, began to enact comprehensive anti-smoking legislation.
On 1 March 2006, Uruguay became the first country in Latin America to prohibit smoking in enclosed public spaces. In March 2008 the legislature approved Law 18.256  which includes six strategies of anti-smoking policy.

Some of the measures by the government were the ban on selling different types of presentations of the same brand of cigarettes, the dissemination of images warning about the risks of smoking and covering at least 80% of the cigarette pack, raising of taxes, banning cigarette advertising in the media, and banning sponsorship of sports events. In addition, smoking was banned in public places such as offices, student centers, bars, restaurants, dances and public places, among others.

The smokefree campaign "Libre de Humo de Tabaco" was gradually implemented by the "Ministerio de Salud Pública del Uruguay" (Ministry of Public Health of Uruguay).

Complaint 

Philip Morris International is a multinational company, a leading producer of cigarettes, of which it owns seven out of twenty global brands.

The tobacco company initiated a claim in the International Centre for Settlement of Investment Disputes (ICSID), a part of the World Bank seeking $25 million in compensation from Uruguay. In that forum, an arbitration tribunal was formed with one arbitrator appointed by each party and a third arbitrator elected by the arbitrators appointed by the parties. The plaintiffs are FTR Holding SA (Switzerland), Philip Morris Products SA (Switzerland) and Abal Hermanos SA (PMI representative in Uruguay) against Uruguay (ICSID Case No. ARB/10/7).

Philip Morris has filed similar cases against Norway and Australia.

Decision  
On 2 July 2013, the tribunal decided it had jurisdiction.

The resolution of the case, which affected international jurisprudence, took 6 years; the case ended on 8 July 2016. The World Bank [ICSID] ruled in favor of Uruguay, forcing the demandant to pay the costs of the defendants and the court.
The final report established that Philip Morris had to pay 7 million dollars to the country for judicial expenses, in addition to paying different amounts for the fees and administrative expenses of the three arbitrators and the CADI. Gary Born emitted a discordant decision in two of the points of the judicial failure.

After its victory in the case, the government declared that from 2017 cigarettes in Uruguay will be sold in generic packaging.

Reactions 

The World Health Organization (WHO) and the Pan American Health Organization (PAHO) supported Uruguay. Uruguay's anti-smoking efforts also received support from past New York City Mayor Michael Bloomberg, and from Bernard Borel, Swiss deputy from the Canton of Vaud.

PAHO made a statement praising the decision:

Effects 

According to Enrico Bonadio, Senior Lecturer in Law at City University London, the ruling in the case "may make it more difficult for tobacco companies to use lawsuits to produce a “chilling effect” and so discourage countries from introducing tobacco control policies."

See also 

Smoking in Uruguay

References

External links 

Uruguayan case law
Constitutional law
Smoking in Uruguay
Tobacco case law
Philip Morris litigation
Jurisprudence
2016 in Uruguay
2010 in Uruguay
Health in Uruguay
José Mujica
Tabaré Vázquez